Doris "Dodie" Barr (August 26, 1921 – July 12, 2009) was a pitcher who played from  through  in the All-American Girls Professional Baseball League. Listed at 5' 6", 145 lb., Barr batted and threw left-handed. She was born in Starbuck, Manitoba, Canada.

Early life

Doris, daughter of Malcolm and Susan Barr, was just a small town girl before she found herself being swept up into the world of women's baseball at the height of the World War II. A dominant lefty hurler, she enjoyed a prolific career over eight seasons in the All-American Girls Professional Baseball League, winning a League Championship title and earning three inductions into several baseball halls of fame across North America.

The AAGBL flourished in the 1940s when the Major Leagues went on hold as men went to war. The league lasted a little over a decade, dismantling in 1954. Still, the void the league filled during wartime was inspiration enough for the 1992 film A League of Their Own, directed by Penny Marshall and starred by Geena Davis, Tom Hanks and Madonna.

Career

Barr started her baseball career in 1937 when she was just 16, after being spotted by scouts while playing catch with her sister.  That sparked a five-year stint in Canada, where she pitched for the Winnipeg Ramblers (1938–1939) and Regina Army and Navy Bombers (1940–1942). She was picked up by the AAGBL when she was 21, and earned a reputation as a powerful lefty hurler with a rocket of a throw.

Barr entered the league in 1943 with the South Bend Blue Sox, playing for them three and a half years before joining the Racine Belles (1946–1947), Springfield Sallies (1948), Muskegon Lassies (1949), Peoria Redwings (1950) and Kalamazoo Lassies (1950). Her most productive season came in 1945, both for South Bend and Racine, when she posted career-numbers in wins (20), earned run average (1.71) and winning percentage (.714), while striking out 104 in 31 pitching appearances. That same season, she also pitched the first no-hitter in Racine history in a game against the Fort Wayne Daisies (July 1, 1945).

In 1946 Barr helped Racine to a Championship after pitching the winning game that put them in the Play-Offs. The next season, he went 14–12 with a 2.26 ERA and 96 strikeouts, while in 1948 she recorded a 2.68 ERA with a career-high 116 strikeouts despite her 7–19 record for the Sallies.

In an eight-season career, Barr posted a 79–94 record with a 3.16 ERA and 572 strikeouts in 218 games. She also helped herself with the bat, hitting a 2.69 batting average, and was a competent outfielder as well, collecting a .932 lifetime fielding average.

Personal life
Barr retired in 1950 and settled into a life as an accountant at Grace Hospital in Winnipeg, Manitoba, and later worked in the accounting department at the Health Sciences Centre.

Eleven girls from Manitoba played in the AAGBL, including Barr. All of them were inducted into the National Baseball Hall of Fame (1988), the Canadian Baseball Hall of Fame (1998), and the Manitoba Baseball Hall of Fame (1998). In addition, she gained induction in the Manitoba Softball Hall of Fame (2004).

Barr never married and did not have children. She died at Winnipeg, at the age of 87, and was buried in the Chapel Lawn Memorial Garden.

Statistics

Sources
 All-American Girls Professional Baseball League Record Book – W. C. Madden. Publisher: McFarland & Company. Format: Paperback, 294pp. Language: English. .

External links
AAGPBL - Biography

All-American Girls Professional Baseball League players
Canadian baseball players
People from Winnipeg Capital Region
1918 births
2009 deaths
Baseball people from Manitoba
Racine Belles (1943–1950) players
South Bend Blue Sox players
Springfield Sallies players
Muskegon Lassies players
Kalamazoo Lassies players
Peoria Redwings players
20th-century American women
Canadian expatriates in the United States
21st-century American women